Oyem Airport  is an airport serving the city of Oyem, in Woleu-Ntem Province, Gabon.

Airlines and destinations

See also

 List of airports in Gabon
 Transport in Gabon

References

External links
Oyem Airport
OurAirports - Oyem

Airports in Gabon